The 53047 / 53048 Howrah–Rampurhat Viswabharati Fast Passenger is a Passenger train belonging to Indian Railways – Eastern Railway zone that runs between  &  in India.

It operates as train number 53047 from Howrah Junction to Rampurhat and as train number 53048 in the reverse direction, serving the state of West Bengal.

Coaches

The 53047 / 53048 Howrah–Rampurhat Viswabharti Fast Passenger presently has 2 AC Chair Car, 3 Second Class reserved seating, 11 General Unreserved & 2 HOG (Seating cum Luggage Rake) coaches. It does not carry a pantry car.

As is customary with most train services in India, coach composition may be amended at the discretion of Indian Railways depending on demand.

Service

The 53047 Howrah–Rampurhat Viswabharti Fast Passenger covers the distance of 219 kilometers in 04 hours 55 mins (44.54 km/hr) & in 05 hours 00 mins as 53048 Rampurhat–Howrah Viswabharti Fast Passenger (43.80 km/hr).

As the average speed of the train is below , as per Indian Railways rules, its fare does not include a Superfast surcharge.

Routeing

Traction

As the route is fully electrified, a Howrah-based WAP-7 powers the train for its entire journey.

Timings

53048 Rampurhat–Howrah Viswabharti Fast Passenger leaves Rampurhat on a daily basis at 05:10 hrs IST and reaches Howrah Junction at 10:10 hrs IST the same day.
53047 Howrah–Rampurhat Viswabharti Fast Passenger leaves Howrah Junction on a daily basis at 16:40 hrs IST and reaches Rampurhat at 21:35 hrs IST the same day.

References

External links

Slow and fast passenger trains in India
Rail transport in West Bengal